Avraham Friedman is an Orthodox rabbi and Talmudic scholar in Skokie, Illinois. Having served the Beis HaMidrash LaTorah yeshiva of the Hebrew Theological College for twenty five years, he was appointed as its Rosh HaYeshiva (dean/head of school) in 2008.

Rabbi Friedman is also an alumnus of the school he heads (Hebrew Theological College - Bais Hamedrash Latorah) where he studied Under, Rav Ahron Soleveichik, one of the most famous Talmudists of modern times and Rav Yaakov Perlow (head of Agudath Israel of America). :  His grandfather-in-law is Rabbi Zalman Sorotzkin, who authored the book Oznayim LaTorah.

Rabbi Friedman has been devoted to Jewish education for many decades. He studied in the Mir yeshiva under some of the Gedolei Hador including Rav Chaim Shmuelevitz z"tl and Rav Nachum Partzovitz z"tl. He was previously a maggid shiur at Yeshivat Kerem B'Yavneh before returning to Hebrew Theological College Beis HaMidrash LaTorah, where he has held numerous positions throughout the past 25 years Including, High school Rebbe, Bais Midrash Rebbe, Mashgiach Of Bais Medrash and Rosh Kollel, before being appointed Rosh HaYeshiva.

References

External links 
 Audio classes by Rabbi Avraham Friedman

American Orthodox rabbis
Hebrew Theological College rosh yeshivas
Living people
Rosh yeshivas
Year of birth missing (living people)